Ínsula is a Spanish magazine which features articles on literary work and literary criticism. Its subtitle is Revista de Letras y Ciencias Humanas. It is based in Madrid, Spain. In terms of format and contents the magazine is similar to the New York Review of Books. Eleanor Wright describes Ínsula as one of the most respected independent literary magazines in the post-war period Spain.

History and profile
The magazine was established in 1946. The first issue appeared in January 1946. Enrique Canito was the founding editor and also, the director. The Spanish poet José Luis Cano was also instrumental in the foundation of the magazine. He served as deputy director and then, director of the magazine. It is published by Espasa Libros on a monthly basis, and its headquarters is in Madrid.  

The magazine has two major periods, from its start in 1946 to 1988 and from 1988 to the present. It focuses on Spanish literature and Portuguese literature. However, in the first period the magazine frequently featured articles about British literature.

Bans
Ínsula was subject to bans during the Franco regime. It was suspended in 1947 due to the publication of José Luis Cano's review of James Joyce's Ulysses. In 1956 Ínsula was also closed down by Spanish authorities due to its November 1955 issue honoring Ortega y Gasset upon his death in 1955. The magazine resumed publication in January 1957.

Legacy
In 1990 a book entitled La Ínsula Sin Nombre: Homenaje a Nilita Vientós Gastón, José Luis Cano y Enrique Canito was published in memory of the former editors of Ínsula.

References

External links

1946 establishments in Spain
Banned magazines
Book review magazines
Censorship in Spain
Cultural magazines
Francoist Spain
Literary magazines published in Spain
Magazines established in 1946
Magazines published in Madrid
Monthly magazines published in Spain
Spanish-language magazines